Édouard de Bergevin (18 July 1861 – 6 December 1925) was a French painter of the Rouen school. He was novelist Colette Yver's brother.

He studied at the academy of painting of Rouen, with Frechon, Angrand and Joseph Delattre for fellow students, then in Paris in the studio of Jean-Léon Gérôme. A highly appreciated portrait painter of his contemporaries, illustrator and poster artist, he was also a delicate landscaper. Often accompanied by his friend Delattre, he realized in the countryside of Douarnenez, views of Paris, views of the ports of Rouen and Brittany.

He is buried at Cimetière monumental de Rouen, next to his sister.

Bibliography 
 
 François Lespinasse, L'École de Rouen, Lecerf, Rouen, 1995

External links 
 Portrait of the painter
 Le Mont-Saint-Michel et ses Merveilles / Édouard de Bergevin

19th-century French painters
20th-century French painters
19th-century French male artists
20th-century French male artists
1861 births
People from Vienne
1925 deaths